Benedetto Borella (14 April 1899 – 13 January 1975) was an Italian rower. He competed at the 1928 Summer Olympics in Amsterdam with the men's eight where they were eliminated in the quarter-final.

References

External links
 

1899 births
1975 deaths
Italian male rowers
Olympic rowers of Italy
Rowers at the 1928 Summer Olympics
Sportspeople from Piacenza
European Rowing Championships medalists